Chrysovalantis Kozoronis (born 3 August 1992) is a Greek professional footballer who plays as a defensive midfielder for Super League 2 club Anagennisi Karditsa.

Career

Ergotelis
Kozoronis started his career with the youth teams of Ergotelis, and signed his first professional contract with the club on May 24, 2012, when the club played in the Football League, the second tier of the Greek football league system. He contributed with 2 goals in 26 appearances to his club's 2nd place finish and subsequent promotion to top flight. In total, over the course of three seasons, Kozoronis made a total of 74 appearances for Ergotelis in all competitions, while also scoring 4 times. At the end of the 2014−15 season, Ergotelis were relegated from the Superleague, and as a result, Kozoronis terminated his contract with the club to sign for Superleague side PAS Giannina.

PAS Giannina
In the summer of 2015 he signed a 3 year contract with PAS Giannina. Kozoronis made 60 league appearances and scored 4 goals for PAS Giannina. He also made 4 appearances in the Europa League and 8 in the Greek Cup. On December 19, 2017 he was released from his contract after an out of court settlement.

Hamilton Academical
On 10 January 2018, Kozoronis joined Hamilton Academical on a deal until the end of the 2018–19 season.

On 20 March 2018, Kozoronis was released by Hamilton having failed to play a single game for the club and making just one appearance on the bench.

Return to Ergotelis
On 13 September 2018, Kozoronis returned to his former club Ergotelis, signing a one-year contract.

Petrolul Ploiești
On 10 January 2019, Petrolul Ploiești announced the signing of the 26-year-old Greek defensive midfielder until the summer of 2020.

Levadiakos
On 23 August 2019, Levadiakos F.C. announced the signing of the Greek defensive midfielder until the summer of 2020.

FK Panevėžys
On 19 August 2020, Panevrėžys announced the signing of the Greek defensive midfielder until the summer of 2021.

On 3 August 2022 he left FK Panevėžys.

Career statistics

Honours
Panevėžys 
Lithuanian Cup: 2020
Lithuanian Supercup: 2021

References

External links

1992 births
Living people
Footballers from Heraklion
Greek footballers
Association football midfielders
Football League (Greece) players
Super League Greece players
Super League Greece 2 players
Liga II players
A Lyga players
Ergotelis F.C. players
PAS Giannina F.C. players
Hamilton Academical F.C. players
FC Petrolul Ploiești players
Levadiakos F.C. players
FK Panevėžys players
Anagennisi Karditsa F.C. players
Greek expatriate footballers
Greek expatriate sportspeople in Scotland
Expatriate footballers in Scotland
Greek expatriate sportspeople in Romania
Expatriate footballers in Romania
Greek expatriate sportspeople in Lithuania
Expatriate footballers in Lithuania